Heatherman was an unincorporated community in Kanawha County, West Virginia, United States. Its post office  has been closed.

References 

Unincorporated communities in West Virginia
Unincorporated communities in Kanawha County, West Virginia